The Coalition for Lesbian and Gay Rights was an umbrella organization based in New York City active from 1977 to 1994. It provided services to lesbian and gay groups trying to end discrimination based on sexual preference.

References

1977 establishments in New York City
Organizations established in 1977
Defunct LGBT organizations based in New York City
1977 in LGBT history